Linköping Hockey Club, often known by its initials LHC, or colloquially among its fans as Cluben, is a Swedish ice hockey club from Linköping, founded in 1976. The home arena of the team is Saab Arena (formerly Cloetta Center) which accommodates 8,500 spectators.

Competing in the Swedish Hockey League (SHL; formerly Elitserien), the club is placed twelfth in the marathon standings for the top Swedish ice hockey league.

History

1942–1975: The club's roots
In 1942, a group of football players of BK Kenty founded the ice hockey club BK Robbi, who mostly played friendlies against other local clubs on Stångån during the winter. The board of Kenty had first been hesitant to establish a hockey department, but in 1945, the two clubs merged following lengthy discussions. Being heavily dependent on weather conditions, Kenty only played 30 games in five seasons during the second half of the 1940s. By the end of the 1950's, Kenty had established itself in Division 2, the domestic second tier. Meanwhile, the club was also granted a permanent home ground at Folkungavallen, close to the city centre. In 1969, Kenty merged with another local club, IK Terra. In the 1970's, Kenty suffered from internal differences, since part of the club's board wanted to financially prioritize football in favor of ice hockey.

1976–1998: Foundation of LHC and rise to Elitserien
Linköping HC was founded on 4 August 1976, as a spin-off from BK Kenty, and moved in to the newly-built indoor arena Stångebro Ishall.

1999–: Establishment in the top division
Linköping HC first played in the Swedish Hockey League (SHL; formerly Elitserien) in the 1999–2000 season, and has been in the top division since the 2001–02 season. They have reached the playoffs eight times. LHC reached the final for the first time in 2006–07, where they lost to Modo Hockey. In the 2007–08 season, Linköping HC advanced to the final again, this time against HV71; they lost and won the silver medal.

Season-by-season results
This is a partial list of the last five seasons completed by Linköpings. For the full season-by-season history, see List of Linköping HC seasons.

Players and personnel

Current roster

Updated 24 February 2023

Honored Members

Franchise records and leaders

Scoring leaders

These are the top-ten point-scorers of Linköping HC since the 1975–76 season, in the top tier (Elitserien and SHL). Figures are updated after each completed regular season.

Note: Pos = Position; GP = Games played; G = Goals; A = Assists; Pts = Points; P/G = Points per game;  = current Linköpings HC player

Appearance leaders

These are the top-ten players of Linköping HC with the most appearances since the 1975–76 season, in the top tier (Elitserien and SHL). Figures are updated after each completed regular season.

Note: Pos = Position; GP = Games played; G = Goals; A = Assists; Pts = Points; P/G = Points per game;  = current Linköpings HC player

Other departments
Linköping's women's football team, Linköpings FC, is affiliated with and financially backed by Linköping HC. On October 3, 2008, the club announced that the elite men's and women's teams of local volleyball club Team Valla would also become affiliated with Linköping HC, under the name Linköpings Volleyboll Club.

References

Works cited

External links

 Official site (in Swedish)

 
Swedish Hockey League teams
Ice hockey teams in Sweden
Sport in Linköping
Ice hockey clubs established in 1976
1976 establishments in Sweden
Ice hockey teams in Östergötland County